East Retford was a rural district in Nottinghamshire, England from 1894 to 1974.

It was formed under the Local Government Act 1894 from East Retford rural sanitary district.  It entirely surrounded Retford, which was a municipal borough itself.

In 1935 it took in the area of the Misterton Rural District under a County Review Order.

The district survived until 1974 when it was abolished under the Local Government Act 1972.  It went to form part of the new Bassetlaw district of Nottinghamshire, except the Finningley parish which became part of the Metropolitan Borough of Doncaster in South Yorkshire.

References
https://web.archive.org/web/20071001030400/http://www.visionofbritain.org.uk/relationships.jsp?u_id=10173577

Districts of England created by the Local Government Act 1894
Districts of England abolished by the Local Government Act 1972
Rural districts of Nottinghamshire
Bassetlaw District